"Burning the Ground" is the 20th single by English new wave band Duran Duran, released in December 1989. It was created as a stand-alone single to promote the compilation album Decade. Its music video was included on the band's audiovisual compilation Greatest, released in 1999 (VHS) and 2003 (DVD). The song is essentially a megamix of Duran Duran's history, featuring snippets of all of the band's hits from the previous 10 years.

Composition
Instrumental elements of "Save a Prayer", "Hungry Like the Wolf", "Rio", "The Reflex" and "The Wild Boys", including the camera sound from "Girls on Film", form the core of the first part of the song, while the "chorus" is built up of alternating chants of "Girls!" (from "Girls on Film") and "Boys!" (from "The Wild Boys").  The nonsense syllables from several songs, such as the "noh-noh" bits from "Notorious", the "bop bop bop" from "Planet Earth" and the "tana nana" and "fle fle fle fle flex" from "The Reflex", were also incorporated. Elements from "A View to a Kill", "Notorious", "I Don't Want Your Love" and later singles are gradually woven into the mix.  Segments of the song are marked by signature phrases taken from other songs: first, "Can you hear me now?" ("Planet Earth"); later, "I tell you, somebody's fooling around" ("The Reflex") and "The rhythm is the power" ("I Don't Want Your Love"). The title derives from a "Hungry Like the Wolf" lyric.

The song also used several sound samples from the film Barbarella, from which the band took their name, to open it: "Barbarella?" "Mr. President!" "Your mission, then: find Durand Durand!" "Just a minute, I'll slip something on!"

The remix was created by producer John Jones, with assistance from Dee Long and engineer Chris Potter, in an upstairs room at Olympic Studios in Barnes while Duran Duran was downstairs recording new material for the album Liberty, to be released the following year.

Music video
The video for "Burning the Ground", much like the song, used snippets of many of Duran Duran's previous audiovisual work, including scenes from their 1985 concert film Arena (An Absurd Notion) and their 1987-1989 Strange Behaviour & Electric Theatre world tours. The video also used footage of burning South American rainforests, as well as the NASA Space Shuttles and even some scenes of the band walking around in the street during the recording sessions for their then-upcoming Liberty album.  It was directed by Adrian Martin.

B-sides, bonus tracks and remixes
The B-side was another megamix, this one more instrumental in nature, called "Decadance".  The song uses the "why" bits of "The Reflex", the "no, no" from "Notorious", "wild" from "The Wild Boys", the chorus from "All She Wants Is", the solo from "Save a Prayer" mixed with "Rio", and a little bit of "Skin Trade", as well as some of the suggestive screams from "Hungry Like the Wolf".

Formats and track listing

7": EMI. / DD 13 United Kingdom
 "Burning the Ground" - 4:00
 "Decadance" - 3:29

12": EMI. / 12DD 13 United Kingdom
 "Burning the Ground" - 4:00
 "Decadance" - 3:29
 "Decadance" (Extended Mix) - 7:57

12": Capitol Records. / V-15546 United States 
 "Burning the Ground" - 4:00
 "Decadance" (Extended Mix) - 7:57
 "Decadance" - 3:29

CD: EMI. / CD DD 13 United Kingdom 
 "Burning the Ground" - 4:00
 "Decadance" - 3:29
 "Decadance" (Extended Mix) - 7:57

CD: part of The Singles 1986–1995 boxset 
 "Burning the Ground" - 4:00
 "Decadance" - 3:29
 "Decadance" (2 Risk E Remix 12'') - 7:57

Chart positions
 #31 UK Singles Chart
 #7 Italy

Other appearances
 Greatest (1999 VHS Edition, 2003 DVD Edition)
 Singles Box Set 1986–1995 (2004)

Personnel
Duran Duran are:
Simon Le Bon – vocals
Nick Rhodes – keyboards
John Taylor – bass guitar
Warren Cuccurullo – guitar
Sterling Campbell – drums

References

External links
 TM's Duran Duran Discography

1989 songs
Duran Duran songs
1989 singles
EMI Records singles
Capitol Records singles
Songs written by Simon Le Bon
Songs written by John Taylor (bass guitarist)
Songs written by Roger Taylor (Duran Duran drummer)
Songs written by Andy Taylor (guitarist)
Songs written by Nick Rhodes